Diving was contested at the 1994 Asian Games in Hiroshima, Japan, from October 3 to October 6, 1994.

Medalists

Men

Women

Medal table

Participating nations
A total of 26 athletes from 9 nations competed in diving at the 1994 Asian Games:

References 

 New Straits Times, October 3–7, 1994
 Results

External links
Medals

 
1994 Asian Games events
1994
Asian Games
1994 Asian Games